Monomagnesium phosphate is one of the forms of magnesium phosphate.  It is a magnesium acid salt of phosphoric acid with the chemical formula Mg(H2PO4)2. Di- and tetrahydrates are known also.  It dissolves in water, forming phosphoric acid and depositing a solid precipitate of Mg(HPO4).3H2O, dimagnesium phosphate. 

As a food additive, it is used as an acidity regulator and has the E number E343.

References

Phosphates
Magnesium compounds
Acid salts
Food additives
E-number additives